Lacenas is a commune in the Rhône department in eastern France.

Twin towns — sister cities

  Canale d'Agordo in Italy (since 2006)

See also
Communes of the Rhône department

References

Communes of Rhône (department)
Beaujolais (province)